The Maracaibo tody-flycatcher (Todirostrum viridanum), also known as the short-tailed tody-flycatcher, is a species of bird in the family Tyrannidae. It is endemic to arid scrub in the region near Lake Maracaibo in Venezuela. It has formerly been considered a subspecies of the common tody-flycatcher, which it resembles.

It is threatened by habitat loss.

References

Maracaibo tody-flycatcher
Birds of Venezuela
Endemic birds of Venezuela
Maracaibo tody-flycatcher
Taxonomy articles created by Polbot